The 1972 NCAA men's volleyball tournament was the third annual tournament to determine the national champion of NCAA men's college volleyball. The tournament was played at Irving Gymnasium at Ball State University in Muncie, Indiana. Like the previous year, the format of this championship consisted of a preliminary, four-team round robin to determine seeding for a subsequent single-elimination tournament.

UCLA defeated San Diego State, 3–2 (10–15, 9–15, 15–9, 15–10, 15–7), in the championship match to win their third consecutive national title. UCLA's Dick Irvin was named the Most Outstanding Player of the tournament.

Qualification
Until the creation of the NCAA Men's Division III Volleyball Championship in 2012, there was only a single national championship for men's volleyball. As such, all NCAA men's volleyball programs (whether from the University Division, or the College Division) were eligible. A total of 4 teams were invited to contest this championship.

Round robin

|}

Bracket 
Site: Irving Gymnasium, Muncie, Indiana

All tournament team 
Dick Irvin, UCLA (Most Outstanding Player)
John Zajec, UCLA
Rick Niemi, Ball State
Randy Stevenson, San Diego State
Wayne Gracey, San Diego State
David DeGroot, UC Santa Barbara

See also 
 NCAA Men's National Collegiate Volleyball Championship

References

NCAA Men's Volleyball Tournament
NCAA Men's Volleyball Championship
NCAA Men's Volleyball Championship
Volleyball in Indiana
NCAA men's volleyball tournament
NCAA men's volleyball tournament